Rhodolaena humblotii is a plant in the family Sarcolaenaceae. It is endemic to Madagascar.

Description
Rhodolaena humblotii grows as a shrub or small to medium-sized tree. The twigs have dense hairs. Its leaves are small and elliptic in shape. The inflorescences bear two flowers on a short peduncle. The fruits are medium-sized and woody.

Distribution and habitat
Rhodolaena humblotii is only found in the eastern regions of Vatovavy-Fitovinany, Alaotra-Mangoro, Analanjirofo and Atsinanana.

Threats
Rhodolaena humblotii is threatened by timber exploitation. The timber is used in construction. Future population decline of the tree due to habitat loss is predicted at 50% to 80%, though subpopulations in protected areas are considered stable.

References

humblotii
Endemic flora of Madagascar
Plants described in 1886